The White Chalk Formation is a Mesozoic geologic formation in southern England. Pterosaur fossils have been recovered from the formation.

See also

 List of pterosaur-bearing stratigraphic units

Footnotes

References

Cretaceous System of Europe